The knockout stage of the 2008 Twenty20 Cup comprises the quarter-finals, semi-finals and final of the 2008 Twenty20 Cup. The top two teams from each of the three groups progressed to the quarter finals along with the two best placed third teams. The teams were redrawn and played one knockout match to decide the semi-finalists. Finals day was held on 26 July 2008.

Quarter-finals

7 July

Durham Dynamos v Yorkshire Carnegie 
The match at the Riverside was postponed in bizarre circumstances. The ECB received allegations about Yorkshire fielding an ineligible player in their final group game, against the Nottinghamshire Outlaws.

In an original meeting on 10 July, Yorkshire were summoned to Old Trafford and were told that they were to be thrown out of the tournament, with Nottinghamshire to be reinstated in the draw. However, Yorkshire appealed and at a second meeting held on 14 July, their appeal was heard and rejected, but this time Glamorgan were placed into the draw on a superior run rate. This was because Nottinghamshire were not awarded the points to the 27 June game.

Essex Eagles v Northamptonshire Steelbacks 

Essex qualify for Finals Day, after a 59-run win at Chelmsford. Ravi Bopara top scored with a 26-ball 47, and was backed up by Graham Napier who added a 20-ball 40, to his record knock of 152* in the group stages. Grant Flower also added 33 from 31 deliveries, as Essex enjoyed the best of conditions, recording three 50+ partnerships. They ended on a total of 192 for 9, after losing their last five wickets for the princely sum of two runs, with South Africans Nicky Boje and Andrew Hall picking up two wickets each.

Rain revised the Northamptonshire target to 175 in 18 overs, and never looked likely to reach that target, with the top five batsmen only scoring eleven runs between them. In fact, only three batsmen made double figures, as the Steelbacks fell a long way short, having recovered from 27 for 5. Boje top scored with an unbeaten knock of 58 from 43 balls, as Napier took 4-10 from his allotted four overs, earning him the man of the match.

8 July

Middlesex Crusaders v Lancashire Lightning 

Middlesex sealed their place in Finals Day, after a 12-run win at their "home" for one game, The Oval. This was of course down to their normal home of Lord's being used for the First Test against South Africa beginning 10 July. Middlesex made an uncertain start, losing openers Billy Godleman and Owais Shah with only two runs on the board. Things got worse and at one point, the Crusaders were 21 for 4. Coming in at number 6, was Dawid Malan who would go on to record the 24th century in the history of the tournament. Lasting 56 minutes, he scored 103 off 54, and helped to lift the total to 176 for 7 after their 20 overs. This performance also gave Malan man of the match. Only Eoin Morgan and Tyron Henderson would also reach double-figures as Andrew Flintoff was pick of the bowlers, taking 3-17 off his four overs.

Lancashire's reply got off to a similar start to the Middlesex innings, with both openers Gareth Cross and Lou Vincent going cheaply. The third wicket of Stuart Law, fell with only fourteen runs on the scoreboard, and it looked ominous for the Lightning. Flintoff then stepped up, and hit a 41-ball 53, but when he fell to Steven Finn, it looked as if the game was up. Steady knocks from Kyle Hogg and Glen Chapple left the Lightning with eighteen to win, off the final six balls. However, Middlesex held out for victory, and progress to the second semi-final on Finals Day.

9–10 July

Warwickshire Bears v Kent Spitfires 

Kent kept their chances of retaining the Twenty20 Cup by hammering the Bears by 42 runs in a rain-delayed match at Edgbaston. The match was played on Thursday, as persistent rain had called off the game, 90 minutes before play on Wednesday. Having been put into bat, the Spitfires reached 37, before losing their first wicket, Joe Denly for 27. Coming to the crease with the score at 54 for 3, was hero of Finals Day last season and the man of the match in this game, Darren Stevens. He then proceeded to make a rapid-fire 69, coming from just 32 deliveries. He was the last wicket to fall, as Azhar Mahmood hit big runs towards the end of the innings, hitting two sixes in a 13-ball 25*. This set the Bears, a target of 176.

Losing Neil Carter in the second over, did not help matters for Warwickshire, as they struggled at the beginning of their reply. Jim Troughton and Jonathan Trott fell in quick succession leaving Warwickshire on 42 for 3. The returning Darren Maddy and Ant Botha pushed the score higher, with Maddy scoring 27 off 18 deliveries and Botha top-scored with 35 off nineteen. However, it was to all be in vain, as the Spitfires' bowling attack always kept them below the 8.8 required run rate. Yasir Arafat was the pick of the bowlers with 3-29.

22 July

Durham Dynamos v Glamorgan Dragons 

Having waited fifteen days to play their quarter-final, Durham progressed to Finals Day on Saturday after a 44-run win at the Riverside. Having been put into bat, the visitors took three early wickets, removing dangermen Phil Mustard, Shivnarine Chanderpaul and Paul Collingwood, with the score only on 26. After Michael Di Venuto fell, Durham looked to be in some trouble. However, a fifth wicket partnership of 53 between Will Smith and captain Dale Benkenstein pushed the score up. Smith made 51 as Durham set a target of 164, for Glamorgan to chase. It could've been somewhat lower had it not been for virtuoso innings by Gareth Breese, smashing 20 off just 9 balls, and Liam Plunkett who hit 12* off 3. James Harris took 3 wickets, but accounted for around a quarter of the runs conceded.

The Glamorgan reply could not have gotten off to a worse start, losing opener Richard Grant very first ball. David Hemp soon followed, becoming Plunkett's second victim, with only seven runs on the board. Glamorgan were always struggling with the run-rate, with most of the top-order recording strike rates of below 100. Only four players made it to double figures, with Jamie Dalrymple top scoring with 32, and had stern support from wicket-keeper Mark Wallace, who fired 26 off sixteen deliveries. However, Glamorgan fell a long way short with Plunkett, the pick of the Durham attack, taking 3-16 off three overs.

Finals Day

Durham, Middlesex, Kent and Essex qualified for the semi-finals from their quarter final ties. Durham were drawn to play Middlesex and Essex played Kent on 26 July 2008. Kent and Middlesex progressed to the final, which was won by Middlesex by 3 runs.

See also
2008 Twenty20 Cup
2008 English cricket season
2008 Twenty20 Cup Finals Day

References

External links

Knockout Stage, 2008 Twenty20 Cup